The Cardboard Citizens New Music Ensemble is an experimental music group based in London, UK. Its members are all homeless, ex-homeless or at risk of becoming homeless people. Founder and director Reynaldo Young, is a composer and performer.

See also
Cardboard Citizens

External links 
Cardboard Citizens Theatre Company

Contemporary classical music ensembles
British experimental musical groups
Free improvisation ensembles